Friede (German: peace) was a fictional spacecraft designed by Hermann Oberth and was featured in the 1929 silent movie Woman in the Moon. The Friede was, at the time, the most realistic depiction of space travel, having multiple stages, liquid fuel, and other details. Having the Friede submerged in water before launch was not replicated for actual Moon launches, however.

In the film, the Friede carried five passengers and a stowaway. The Friede was designed to travel to the Moon in search of gold, and the crew successfully found gold on the Moon. One crew member, Turner, tried to hijack the ship. Turner was shot and killed, but the bullets damaged the oxygen tanks, and the crew came to the grim realization that one of them must remain. Two people stayed behind on the Moon, which was depicted as having a breathable atmosphere.

During the 1930s, all schematics and blueprints related to the Friede were confiscated by the Gestapo and were lost during the war. Hermann Oberth had trouble creating a flying miniature for the premiere of the movie.

References

Fictional spacecraft